John Shorter may refer to:
 John Gill Shorter (1818–1872), 17th Governor of Alabama from 1861 to 1863
 John Urquhart Shorter (1844–1904),  Confederate officer, lawyer, poet; nephew of the above
 John Shorter Pty Ltd, former Australian manufacturing import company, founded in 1884
 Sir John Shorter, Lord Mayor of London in 1687

See also 
 John Shorter Stevens